Cirripectes vanderbilti, the scarface blenny, is a species of combtooth blenny found in coral reefs in the Hawaiian and Johnston islands in the eastern central Pacific ocean.  This species reaches a length of  SL.

The species was first described in 1938 by Henry W. Fowler under the name Ophioblennius vanderbilti from a specimen collected near Diamond Head, Oahu in 1937 by the George Vanderbilt South Pacific Expedition.

References

vanderbilti
Fish of Hawaii
Fish described in 1938